The Bhil Meena (also spelled Bhil Mina) are a tribal group found in the state of Rajasthan, India.

Mainly they are mixed tribe of tribal Meenas and Bhils.

Social status 
, the Bhil Meenas were classified as a Scheduled Tribe under the Indian government's reservation program of positive discrimination.

Demographics

Rajasthan

Madhya Pradesh

References

External links 

Social groups of Rajasthan
Scheduled Tribes of Rajasthan